Hertta Elina Kuusinen (14 February 1904 – 18 March 1974) was a Finnish Communist politician. She was a member of the central committee (1944–1971) and the political bureau of the Communist Party of Finland; member of Finland's parliament, the Eduskunta (1945–1972); general secretary (1952–1958); and leader of the parliamentary group of the Finnish People's Democratic League.

Early life
Born in Luhanka on 14 February 1904, she was the daughter of Soviet politician and one-time Finnish communist leader Otto Ville Kuusinen. Hertta Kuusinen moved to the Soviet Union after her father in the 1920s. She worked for the Comintern beginning in 1922, witnessed Adolf Hitler's rise to power in Germany during 1932–1933, and taught in the International Lenin School from 1933 to 1934. Kuusinen returned to Finland in 1934 to work underground for the illegal communist party. Instead she ended up in prison for over ten years.

Career
Kuusinen became known for being the leading female communist in post-war Finland. In 1948, she became only the second woman to serve as a Finnish cabinet minister.

The political climate in Finland changed after World War II. Kuusinen was released; and in the first post-war elections held in 1945, she was elected to the Eduskunta from the Finnish People's Democratic League (SKDL) list. She was General Secretary of the SKDL from 1952 to 1958, when the SKDL became the largest party in the Eduskunta with 50 of 200 seats. She was a member of Parliament until 1972, and also held the record in personal votes (58 770 / 1948) received in parliamentary elections that stood until the 2007 election.  Between 1969 and 1974, Kuusinen served as the chairperson of the Women's International Democratic Federation.

Personal life
Kuusinen was married to communist politicians Tuure Lehén (1923–1933) and Yrjö Leino (1945–1950).

Death
She died in Moscow on 18 March 1974, aged 70.

References

Further reading
Hertta Kuusinen Papers, Kansan arkisto (People's archive) Helsinki, Finland
Pirkko Kotila, "Hertta Kuusinen - the leading communist woman in Finland in the post-war era" "People of a special mould"?  International conference on comparative communist biography and prosopography Manchester, 6–8 April 2001
Pirkko Kotila, "Hertta Kuusinen - The 'Red Lady of Finland,'" Science and Society, Vol. 70, No. 1, January 2006: 46-71
Brita Polttila, Hertta Kuusinen - Ihmisen tie. Helsinki: Tammi, 1975

1904 births
1974 deaths
People from Luhanka
People from Mikkeli Province (Grand Duchy of Finland)
Communist Party of Finland politicians
Finnish People's Democratic League politicians
Members of the Parliament of Finland (1945–48)
Members of the Parliament of Finland (1948–51)
Members of the Parliament of Finland (1951–54)
Members of the Parliament of Finland (1954–58)
Members of the Parliament of Finland (1958–62)
Members of the Parliament of Finland (1962–66)
Members of the Parliament of Finland (1966–70)
Members of the Parliament of Finland (1970–72)
Women government ministers of Finland
20th-century Finnish women politicians
Women members of the Parliament of Finland
Finnish expatriates in the Soviet Union
International Lenin School alumni